Ruffo is a surname. Notable people with the surname include:

Noble house of Ruffo di Calabria 
Fabrizio Ruffo (1744–1827), Italian cardinal
Fulco Ruffo di Calabria (1884–1946), Italian World War I flying ace
Giordano Ruffo (1200-1256), Italian nobleman and early writer on equestrian medicine 
Paola Ruffo di Calabria (born 1937), queen consort of Belgium
Tommaso Ruffo (1663–1753), Italian cardinal
Polissena Ruffo (1400–1420), princess of Calabria

Others 
Albert J. Ruffo (1908–2003), American politician
Andrée Ruffo, Canadian judge
Antonio Ruffo (1610s–1678), Sicilian politician, nobleman, patron, and collector
Armand Garnet Ruffo (born 1955), Canadian scholar, filmmaker, writer and poet
Bruno Ruffo (1920–2007), Italian motorcycle road racer
Dennis Ruffo, Canadian music promoter
Ernesto Ruffo Appel (born 1952), American-born governor of Baja California
John Ruffo (born 1954), American business executive
Johnny Ruffo (born 1988), Australian singer, songwriter, dancer, actor and television presenter
Leonora Ruffo (1935–2007), Italian film actress
Marco Ruffo, Italian architect
Pietro Ruffo (born 1978), Italian artist
Titta Ruffo (1877–1953), Italian baritone
Victoria Ruffo (born 1962), Mexican actress
Vincenzo Ruffo (c. 1508–1587), Italian composer of the Renaissance

Italian-language surnames